Chen Cheng-sheng (born 26 January 1950) is a Taiwanese politician who served in the Legislative Yuan from 1999 to 2002.

Chen attended Shih Hsin University, National Chung Hsing University, Tunghai University, and Chinese Culture University, where he received a doctorate in history.

After graduation, Chen worked for the Taiwan Provincial Government and grew close to Chiang Ching-kuo. He represented the New Party in the 1997 Nantou County magistracy election, but withdrew from the party after losing to Peng Pai-hsien. Chen was elected to the legislature as an independent in 1998. In 2000, he joined the People First Party and was named the PFP's caucus leader. Chen also served as the party's spokesperson. In 2009, Chen ran for the Nantou County Magistracy as a Non-Partisan Solidarity Union candidate after his expulsion from the Kuomintang. He finished third in the election. In August 2011, Chen was named the People First Party candidate for Taipei 6th district. He was linked to Hsu Hsin-ying in 2015, who later split from the Kuomintang to found her own party, the Minkuotang.

References

1950 births
Living people
Politicians of the Republic of China on Taiwan from Nantou County
Changhua County Members of the Legislative Yuan
Members of the 4th Legislative Yuan
People First Party Members of the Legislative Yuan
Kuomintang Members of the Legislative Yuan in Taiwan
Non-Partisan Solidarity Union politicians
Expelled members of the Kuomintang
Shih Hsin University alumni
National Chung Hsing University alumni
Tunghai University alumni
Chinese Culture University alumni
New Party (Taiwan) politicians
Minkuotang politicians